Wincenty Pstrowski (28 May 1904 – 18 April 1948) was a Polish miner, known as the Polish Stakhanov and  recognized with awards for his high productivity, during the Three Year Plan.

Pstrowski was given the title of przodownik pracy when in 1947 he achieved 270 percent expected efficiency per month.  Pstrowski died in 1948 due to misconducted dental intervention, but in popular opinion (and official propaganda), due to deadly exhaustion.

See also
Piotr Ożański

References

Bibliography
Nazwy do zmiany / ul. Pstrowskiego Wincentego stronie IPN

Polish miners
Recipients of the Order of the Builders of People's Poland
1904 births
1948 deaths
People from Zabrze